Colgate is a hamlet in the Rural Municipality of Lomond No. 37, Saskatchewan, Canada. The community had a population of 34 in 2017. It previously held the status of village until May 16, 2000.

Demographics 
Prior to November 4, 2000, Colgate was incorporated as a village, and was restructured as a hamlet under the jurisdiction of the RM of Lomond No. 37 on that date.

Colgate IBA 
The community of Colgate sits at the north-east corner of the Colgate (SK 013) Important Bird Area (IBA) of Canada. It is a protected area for birds totalling . The site consists of native grasslands, Neptune Lake, and rivers in the Souris River watershed, such as Jewel Creek and Long Creek. Birds important to the area include the ferruginous hawk and burrowing owl. The grasslands are partially protected by the RM of Lomond's Prairie Farm Rehabilitation Administration (PFRA) and are classified as a Wildlife Management Unit.

See also 
List of communities in Saskatchewan
Hamlets of Saskatchewan

References 

Lomond No. 37, Saskatchewan
Former villages in Saskatchewan
Unincorporated communities in Saskatchewan
Populated places disestablished in 2000
Division No. 2, Saskatchewan
Important Bird Areas of Saskatchewan